Roosville is a locality on the Canada-US border between Montana and British Columbia.  It may refer to:
Roosville, British Columbia
Roosville, Montana